Trypeticinae is a subfamily of clown beetles in the family Histeridae. There are at least 3 genera and more than 110 described species in Trypeticinae.

Genera
These three genera belong to the subfamily Trypeticinae:
 Pygocoelis Lewis, 1897
 Trypeticus Marseul, 1864
 Trypobius Schmidt, 1893

References

Further reading

 
 
 
 
 
 

Histeridae